The 1994–95 season was Stoke City's 88th season in the Football League and 32nd in the second tier.

In the summer of 1994 manager Joe Jordan made a number of alterations to his squad with the best being the signing of Canadian Paul Peschisolido from Birmingham City. As the season started there was no change in the fans' relationship with Jordan and it came as no surprise when he resigned in September. Asa Hartford took the caretaker role until Lou Macari made a return from Celtic. His first match back saw Stoke beat West Bromwich Albion 4–1 and there were high hopes that it could spark a promotion push. Alas just one win from 13 matches (26 December to 21 March) saw Stoke finish in a mid table position of 11th.

Season review

League
In the summer of 1994 Joe Jordan brought in Canadian Paul Peschisolido from Birmingham City in a deal which sent striker Dave Regis to St. Andrews along with £200,000. He also brought in Carl Muggleton (who was on loan last season), Keith Downing and John Dreyer. Everyone knew that the 1994–95 season was going to be a tough one and manager Jordan arranged a strenuous pre-season training camp in Scotland. The league programme started with a 1–0 victory over Tranmere Rovers but this was followed up with poor results which saw Stoke lose 4–0 back-to-back at Reading and then Bolton Wanderers. Shortly after that defeat at Bolton Jordan resigned which was unsurprising as he remained unpopular with the club's supporters.

Asa Hartford assumed the role of caretaker manager for a short time and in his four games in charge Stoke won three. On 30 September 1994 Lou Macari became the first manager to have a second spell at the club returning from Celtic. His first match back saw Stoke beat West Bromwich Albion 4–1 but a poor defeat against Luton Town in the next match saw his attentions turn to strengthening the squad. In came Kevin Keen, Ray Wallace and Lárus Sigurðsson as Stoke entered 1995 just out of the top group of teams. But just one win in 13 saw Stoke fall further behind and whilst there was no danger of dropping too greatly there was no hope of catching the promotion contenders and Stoke had to settle for a mid-table finish of 11th picking up 63 points.

FA Cup
Stoke didn't have to wait too long to come up against Joe Jordan who had returned to Bristol City and he was given a frosty reception by the supporters but his side managed to win the third round replay at the Victoria Ground 3–1.

League Cup
Stoke drew Fulham in the second round and after a 3–2 loss at Craven Cottage Stoke beat Fulham 1–0 and progressed via the away goals rule. In the next round Stoke lost to eventual winners Liverpool, 2–1 at Anfield.

Final league table

Results

Legend

Football League First Division

FA Cup

League Cup

Anglo-Italian Cup

Friendlies

Squad statistics

References

Stoke City F.C. seasons
Stoke City F.C.